Slow medicine is a movement calling for change in medical practice which took inspiration from the wider slow food movement. Practitioners of slow medicine have published several different definitions, but the common emphasis is on the word "slow," meaning to allow the medical practitioner to have sufficient time with the patient. Like the slow food movement, slow medicine calls for more balance, countering the over-emphasis on fast processes which reduce quality.

Development of slow medicine

The first mention of slow medicine in print took place in the first decade of the twenty-first century, about fifteen years after the start of the slow food movement in Italy.  In the year 2002 an article was published in an Italian medical journal which used the words "slow medicine" to mean an approach to medicine which would allow practitioners sufficient time to evaluate the patient and his or her wider social context, to reduce anxiety, to evaluate new methods and technologies, to prevent premature release from the hospital and also to provide adequate emotional support. Later, in English-language publications, several physicians independently started using the term slow medicine.

A slow medicine society was formed in Italy in the year 2011, and the first Italian national conference on slow medicine took place in Turin, Italy in November, 2011.  Since that time, slow medicine societies have been formed in other countries.

Principles of slow medicine

Different medical practitioners emphasize different aspects of medicine when using the term "slow medicine."  For some, slow medicine means taking time and not rushing when evaluating a patient. For others, slow medicine is a careful evaluation of medical evidence and a desire not to "overdiagnose" or "overtreat." The original Slow Medicine society in Italy points to three key words of being "measured," "respectful" and "equitable," which focuses on the social and political aspects of medicine. One early practitioner of slow medicine sees the patient in the metaphor of a plant which needs to be nourished and for impediments to be removed in order to allow healing to occur.

See also
Slow movement (culture)
Narrative medicine
Victoria Sweet
Pamela Wible
Rita Charon

References

Further reading
McCullough, Dennis (2009). My Mother, Your Mother: Embracing "Slow Medicine," the Compassionate Approach to Caring for Your Aging Loved Ones, Harper Perennial, an imprint of HarperCollins Publishers. 
Finkelstein, Michael (2013). Slow Medicine: Hope and Healing for Chronic Illness (Previous title: 77 Questions for Skillful Living: A New Path to Extraordinary Health), William Morrow Paperbacks; an imprint of HarperCollins Publishers.   
Sweet, Victoria (2017). Slow Medicine: The Way to Healing, Riverhead Books; an imprint of Penguin Random House.

External links
 Slow Medicine: A Short History

Health care quality
Slow movement